Padstow Heights, a suburb of local government area of the City of Canterbury-Bankstown, located 22 kilometres south-west of the Sydney central business district, in the state of New South Wales, Australia. It is a part of the South-western Sydney region. Padstow is a separate suburb to the north and One Tree Point is a locality within Padstow Heights.

Geography
Padstow Heights is a mostly residential suburb bounded on the east by Salt Pan Creek and to the south by the Georges River. The Alfords Point Bridge links Padstow Heights to Alfords Point in the Sutherland Shire.

Transport
The local bus route, 927 takes residents from One Tree Point to Padstow.

History

The Padstow area was first named Padstow Park Estate after a town called Padstow in Cornwall, England. It was named for being the "holy place of St Petrock" (not to be confused with St Patrick), an important Cornish saint.

Population
As per the 2016 Census, there were 3,540 people in Padstow Heights. 74.0% of people were born in Australia and 73.0% of people spoke only English at home. Other languages spoken at home included Greek 5.1% and Arabic 3.5%. The most common responses for religion were Catholic 30.3%, Anglican 18.5%, No Religion 14.9% and Eastern Orthodox 11.1%.

Notable residents
 Jason Clare – Member for Blaxland in the federal parliament is currently living in Padstow Heights.
 Jayden El-Jalkh – A Lebanon international rugby league footballer who plays as a winger for the Western Suburbs Magpies in the NSW Cup.
Roger Rogerson – controversial former detective-sergeant of the New South Wales Police Force was living in the area before he was incarcerated for the murder of Jamie Gao

References

Suburbs of Sydney
City of Canterbury-Bankstown